La Leona may refer to:

La Leona (guitar), a famous guitar owned by Miguel Llobet
La Leona, Costa Rica, a small town in Costa Rica
La Leona, Texas, a small settlement in Texas, USA
Paseo La Leona, a pass in Honduras
Parque La Leona, a park in Honduras
La Leona River, a river in Argentina
La Leona (film), a 1964 Argentine film
La Leona (Argentine telenovela), an Argentine telenovela that aired in 2016
La Leona (Mexican telenovela), a telenovela that aired in 1961